Bruce Donald Jette is a former U.S. Army officer, United States Military Academy and MIT graduate, and entrepreneur who previously served as the United States Assistant Secretary of the Army for Acquisition, Logistics, and Technology.

Early life and education
Bruce D. Jette was born of Edward D. Jette and Eileen P. Harnett on June 14, 1954, in Astoria, Queens. His father, Edward, was a commercial artist and fighter pilot in the Army Air Corps during World War II. Edward was shot down near the end of the war and spent the last days as a prisoner of war. He later returned to service to train pilots for the Korea conflict. Eileen transitioned from full-time mother to single working mom upon Edward's death when Jette was 12.  

At the age of five, Jette decided to attend West Point and become an armor officer in the United States Army after watching an episode of The West Point Story. He focused his energies on the academics, sports, and extracurricular activities in school which would improve his chances to be accepted. 

During his years at Red Bank Regional High School, Red Bank, New Jersey, (1968 - 1972) Jette focused on math and science. His extracurricular activities included serving as president of the computer and photography clubs, running track and cross-country, swimming, and diving on the one-meter board. After school, Jette worked at a small company that produced specialty cameras for hospital use, manufacturing some components and servicing equipment throughout the northeast. To extend his education, Jette attended evening classes at the Brookdale Community College during his senior year.   He joined the Boy Scouts of America through which he had his first introduction to the United States Military Academy during a scouting camping trip.

Jette applied for and received a nomination (Cong. James J. Howard, NJ3) and admission to the United States Military Academy West Point (class of 1976).  He was a member of Company F, 2nd Regiment, (F-2) Corps of Cadets all four years.  His studies focused on chemistry and nuclear engineering. Jette was recognized on the Commandant's List for Military Excellence and became parachute qualified in 1974 at Fort Benning, Georgia. Jette continued participating in swimming and diving during his plebe (freshman) year. He ran cross-country and swam for his company during intramurals for the last three years at West Point. He competed in intercollegiate equestrian riding, dressage and jumping, all four years, winning 1st place in dressage and being recognized at nationals. During his Firsty (senior) year, Jette won the Mounted Attack Saber Drill hitting all targets in the shortest time with best form. Because of his abilities on horseback, Jette became the Black Knight (West Point's mascot) and a mule rider, often charging down a cadet cordon with sword and shield in full knight garb leading the football team onto the field. On June 2, 1976, Jette graduated with a Bachelor of Science with dual concentrations (West Point did not have majors at that time) in Nuclear Engineering and Chemistry. Prior to graduation, Jette completed and passed his Professional Engineer-in-Training (EIT) exam from the State of Pennsylvania.

Career

Operational career
Jette was commissioned a second lieutenant (2LT) of Armor and, subsequent to graduation, attended Armor Basic Course and Motor Officer Course at Fort Knox, Kentucky, before departing for his first assignment as platoon leader, 3rd platoon, Charlie Troop, 1st Squadron, 11th Armored Cavalry Regiment (ACR) patrolling the East German border. In addition to staff position, Jette commanded Headquarters and Headquarters Troop, 1/11 ACR, B company 6-32 Armor, B company 3-68 Armor, and B company 2-68 Armor. Jette was an operations officer in his staff positions as assistant S-3 and S-3 Air in 1st Brigade, 4th Infantry Division, Fort Carson, and assistant S-3 and acting S-3, 3rd Brigade, 8th Infantry Division. Captain Jette was then selected as S-3, 2-68 Armor Battalion, 8th Infantry Division, Baumholder Germany.

Educational career
The Vice Chief of Staff of the U.S. Army, General Maxwell R. Thurman, recognized the need for a highly technical future Army by establishing a program in which he selected 12 officers who had demonstrated technical competence through their education and a high degree of tactical and operational competence, Capt. Jette being one of the twelve. Jette was accepted to MIT, where he earned a Master of Science in Materials Science. His master's thesis was titled "Feasibility of electrodeposition of yttrium and barium" and was published in 1991. He also earned a Doctor of Philosophy in Solid-state physics from the MIT. His doctoral thesis was titled "Critical mechanisms of nanoscopic electrochemical deposition induced by the scanning tunneling microscope" and was published in 1993.

Acquisition career
Upon graduation, Maj. Jette assumed duties as science advisor to the Chief of Staff of the Army, General Gordon R. Sullivan, authoring some of the concept papers which initiated the digital battlefield. Assessed into the U.S. Army Acquisition Corps, Maj. Jette was centrally selected as Product Manager, Aerial Common Sensor, in which he fielded Guardrail Common Sensor – System II and Airborne Reconnaissance Low – Multifunction, for which he was selected as Product Manager of the Year. He also participated in meetings of the Army Science Board. Lieutenant Colonel Jette was centrally selected, again, and deferred from the War College to take on the position of Program Manager, Soldier Systems, in which he took the Land Warrior program to production through innovative application of commercial technologies by leveraging Silicon Valley expertise. He then recommended the formation of Program Executive Office – Soldier, which was authorized and he established. Between 1998 and 2001, he was assigned to the Land Warrior program. As program manager, the then-Colonel Jette, phased out the running contract which was over budget and not working and hired new contractors, turning the project around. Colonel Jette was credited with Military Education Level I (War College Completion), in part, due to his visiting fellow status at the Hoover Institution at Stanford University.  

Then, General Eric Shinseki assigned Colonel Jette as deputy for acquisition – Objective Force Task Force, responsible for designing the future force architecture. While in that position, 9/11 occurred and Col. Jette was provided the additional duty of supporting the Vice Chief of Staff of the Army, General John (Jack) Keane, as he addressed emerging challenges in Afghanistan.  Colonel Jette recommended the use of small robots to clear caves rather than sending soldiers in and was given the task of doing so. Removing his rank and personally putting the first robots in the caves, Col. Jette initiated the first use of robots in combat and established the U.S. Army Rapid Equipping Force. During the next 2 ½ years, Jette served in both Afghanistan and Iraq, bringing technological innovation to soldiers on patrols or in convoys. His actions earned him a Bronze Star. He also served in Kuwait.

He reported that the Army had accomplished significant improvements and costs reductions by using off-the-shelf-technology.

Jette served as founding director of the U.S. Army Rapid Equipping Force (REF) between 2001 and 2005. In May 2002, he formed a small team to deploy "packbots" in only 28 days as a solution for finding enemy caves and tunnels in Afghanistan. Half of the REF's 40 members were forward deployed in both Afghanistan and Iraq. The unit was tasked with finding answers to threats such as IED's, snipers or mortars. REF developed and fielded the first IED jammers, and satisfied more than 50 requirements from various Army units in 2004. In addition to their defense capabilities, packbots were used to map enemy areas. REF's budget grew to $220 million in the first two years of its existence.

Retiring from the military after 28 years of service in 2005, Jette founded Synovision Solutions LLC, a technology development and engineering consulting firm serving both commercial industry and government. Energy projects were a major focus area of the company. Jette received patents for neutrally buoyant proppant and robotic drilling systems, the latter of which can be used for improving well recovery or more practical application of geothermal energy. After conducting a study on convoys in Iraq, Jette wrote a paper proposing that reducing energy consumption in the war zone would reduce casualties, subsequently developing a method of insulation structures to reduce overall fuel consumption, which was cited by an Army Material Studies Analysis Agency (AMSAA) study for saving lives and fuel costs. This effort lead to development of a blast and fire-resistant modular structures with integrated renewable smart energy management deployed to a number of military sites worldwide. The company advised military systems managers and worked with the Defense Advanced Research Projects Agency, the U.S. Army, and the Office of the Secretary of Defense. He remained a member of the Board on Army Science and Technology.
Jette was an adjunct professor at Georgetown University's Center for Security Studies.

Assistant Secretary of the Army for Acquisition, Logistics, and Technology
Following President Trump's election in 2016, Jette was asked to, once again, serve in the government, this time as the Assistant Secretary of the Army for Acquisition, Logistics, and Technology (ASA(ALT)). He was nominated by President Donald Trump to be the ASA(ALT), on the recommendation of Secretary of Defense Jim Mattis, on October 5, 2017, and confirmed by Senate Voice Vote on December 20 of that year. Secretary Jette assumed the duties of ASA(ALT) on January 2, 2018.  On March 7, 2018, Jette first testified before the United States House Committee on Armed Services.

On March 12, 2018, Jette was officially sworn in as ASA (ALT). In this function, he is the senior executive for acquisitions and procurements of the Army and also its senior official for the area of research and development. Jette has focused on streamlining and reorganizing the Program Executive Offices to more readily align with the Army's emerging operational priorities; implementing a more technologically aggressive approach to material development; reinvigorating the industrial base; reducing the logistical burden on the battlefield; and streamlining contracting to attract new innovative companies while strengthening delivery of capabilities from the core defense industry. He also advises the Secretary of the Army on science. In addition, Jette is responsible for all logistic matters in the Army.

In April 2018, he published an article in the Army AL&T Magazine, in which he urged a fundamental cultural change in the Army's acquisition organization more closely aligned with the soldiers as strategic thought and material solutions providers.

On January 6, 2021, it was announced Jette would leave his ASA(ALT) position no later than January 20, 2021. He was succeeded by Douglas R. Bush.

Personal life
Jette met Catherine A. O'Hara and married her a year after his graduation from the United States Military Academy and upon her graduation from Douglas College, Rutgers, NJ.  They have two sons and one daughter.  His oldest son graduated from the United States Military Academy in 2001 as a 2nd lieutenant of Military Intelligence. His daughter graduated from the United States Military Academy in 2004 as a 2nd lieutenant in the Signal Corps. His youngest son enlisted in the Virginia National Guard as an infantryman and, following basic training, served as a turret gunner on an Armored Security Vehicle protecting convoys in Iraq and, now, serves in the West Virginia National Guard, Special Forces unit. Jette served with two of his children in Iraq.

Awards
He has received numerous awards, including the Distinguished Service Medal, the Legion of Merit (3), the Bronze Star Medal and the Meritorious Service Medal (3).

References

1954 births
Living people
Red Bank Regional High School alumni
United States Military Academy alumni
United States Army officers
MIT School of Engineering alumni
Recipients of the Meritorious Service Medal (United States)
Recipients of the Legion of Merit
Recipients of the Distinguished Service Medal (US Army)
American magazine writers
Trump administration personnel
United States Department of Defense officials